Adesmus borgmeieri is a species of beetle in the family Cerambycidae. It was described by Lane in 1976. It is known from Brazil.

References

Adesmus
Beetles described in 1976